Jerry Thomas may refer to:

 Jerry Thomas (bartender) (1830–1885), American bartender
 Jerry Thomas (baseball) (born 1935), American baseball player
 Jerry Thomas (Royal Marines officer), British general

See also
Gerry Thomas (1922–2005), salesman
Jeremy Thomas (born 1949), British film producer
Gerard Thomas (1663–1721), painter
Gerald Thomas (disambiguation)